Abisara chela, the spot Judy, is a small but striking butterfly found in India that belongs to the family Riodinidae.

Description

Closely resembles Abisara neophron but is smaller in both sexes and differs as follows: 
Upperside of forewings has discal white band comparatively broader and shorter, not extending to vein 1, of more even width, not so conspicuously narrowed posteriorly; postdiscal white band more clearly defined and ending anteriorly in a prominent subcostal white spot. Hindwing differs in the subterminal broken white lines being bordered inwardly in interspaces 1 to 3 by much darker brown spots than in A. neophron; the conspicuous oval black spots near apices of interspaces of 5 and 6 much as in A. neophron, but the outer of the two subterminal short lines beyond them ochraceous, not white; tail at apex of vein 4 as in A. neophron, but proportionately shorter. Underside as in A. neophron, but the postdiscal band on the forewing comparatively broader and more clearly defined; the postdiscal area broadly lilac coloured.

See also
Riodinidae
List of butterflies of India
List of butterflies of India (Riodinidae)

References

Abisara
Butterflies of Asia
Butterflies described in 1843